Gilles d'Ettore (born 23 May 1968 in Agde, Hérault) was a member of the National Assembly of France.  He represented Hérault's 7th constituency from 2007 to 2012 as a member of the Union for a Popular Movement.

References

1968 births
Living people
People from Agde
The Republicans (France) politicians
Union for a Popular Movement politicians
The Popular Right
Mayors of places in Occitania (administrative region)
Deputies of the 13th National Assembly of the French Fifth Republic
French people of Italian descent